Henry III, Count of Gorizia (c. 1263-1323) was a member of the Meinhardiner dynasty.

Biography
He was the son of Count Albert I of Gorizia and his wife, Euphemia of Silesia-Głogów.  In 1295-1299 he accompanied the father in his invasion of Istria against the patriarchate of Aquileia, conquering Plomin, Labin,  Buzet and Tolmin, although the arrival of a large patriarchal army of the  forced them to return.

He succeeded his father as Count of Gorizia in 1304, inheriting the fiefs in Friuli, Istria, Carniola and Carinthia, while his brother Albert II received only  the Puster Valley.

During the feudal wars that marked the initial reign of Ottobuono di Razzi as patriarch of Aquileia, Henry was initially allied with Rizzardo IV da Camino. The two conquered several castles and strongholds, including that of Spilimbergo. However, in 1310 Henry changed side, receiving the position of general captain of the patriarchate and pushing back the Treviso troops from Friuli. He was also named podestà of Trieste in 1311.

Marriage and issue 
He first married in 1297 to Beatrix da Camino, daughter of Gerard.  With her, he had one son,   Meinhard V.

In 1322, Henry III married his second wife, Beatrix of Lower Bavaria, the daughter of Stephen I, Duke of Bavaria (1271-1310).  With her, he had another son,  John Henry IV (1322-1338)

Ancestry

References

1263 births
1323 deaths
Counts of Gorizia
13th-century people of the Holy Roman Empire
14th-century people of the Holy Roman Empire